This episode list contains the details of three seasons and sixty-six episodes of the animated television series, Martin Mystery.

Series overview

Episodes

Season 1 (2003–2004)

Season 2 (2004)

Season 3 (2005–2006)

Crossover special

External links
 

Lists of Canadian children's animated television series episodes
Lists of French animated television series episodes

sl:Martin Mystery